Gananoque
is a town in the Leeds and Grenville area of Ontario, Canada. The town had a population of 5,383 year-round residents in the 2021 Canadian Census, as well as summer residents sometimes referred to as "Islanders" because of the Thousand Islands in the Saint Lawrence River, Gananoque's most important tourist attraction. The Gananoque River flows through the town and the St. Lawrence River serves as the southern boundary of the town.

Pronunciation 
The town's name is an aboriginal name which means "town on two rivers". The town's name rhymes with the place name Cataraqui, which appears in the Cataraqui River, the Little Cataraqui Creek, and the Cataraqui Cemetery in nearby Kingston, Ontario. One way to remember its pronunciation is "The right way, the wrong way, and the Gananoque". In eastern Ontario speech, the town name is often abbreviated to Gan.

History 

Colonel Joel Stone, who served with Loyalist militia during the American Revolutionary War, established a settlement on this site in 1789. Land was granted to Col. Stone for use as a mill site.

During the War of 1812, American forces raided the government depot in the town to disrupt the flow of British supplies between Kingston and Montreal.  The raiders seized the supplies they found and burned the depot. Within a month of the raid, construction of the Gananoque Blockhouse was started, with completion in 1813. It had an octagonal log parapet containing five guns. The blockhouse was abandoned after the War of 1812 and given to a private landowner.

The blockhouse was quickly repaired in the 1837–38 Patriot War when there were fears American militia forces were planning to attack. The Gananoque Blockhouse stood until 1852.

Demographics

Population trend:
 Population in 2016: 5159 
 Population in 2011: 5194
 Population in 2006: 5285
 Population in 2001: 5167
 Population in 1996: 5219 (or 5217 when adjusted for boundary changes)
 Population in 1991: 5209

Total private dwellings, excluding seasonal cottages: 2,404 (total: 2,516).

Mother tongue:
 English as first language: 94.2%
 French as first language: 1.3%
 English and French as first language: 0.4%
 Other as first language: 4.1%

Local attractions 

Gananoque is referred to as the "Gateway to the Thousand Islands," which lie next to it in the St. Lawrence River. Local attractions include boat cruises through the Thousand Islands and to Boldt Castle, New York, live theatre, the summer theatre festival of The Thousand Islands Playhouse, the Arthur Child Heritage Museum of the 1000 Islands and the Shorelines Casino Thousand Islands. The theatre company in Gananoque is The Thousand Islands Playhouse which operates two theatre spaces: The Springer Theatre, and the Firehall Theatre, attracting international attention since 1982.

The Thousand Islands – Frontenac Arch Biosphere Reserve, designated in November 2002, is the third in Ontario, the twelfth in Canada, and one of over 400 around the world, and is part of UNESCO’s program on Man and the Biosphere.

Transportation 
Gananoque lies directly on three of Canada's busiest transportation routes: the four-lane Highway 401, the double-track Canadian National Railway main line, and the St. Lawrence Seaway. It is also home to a rich provincial highway heritage, being home to the remaining stretch of Highway 2. It is the western terminus of the Thousand Islands Parkway, and a short drive from the Thousand Islands Bridge, which crosses into the United States as Interstate 81.

Via Rail inter-city passenger trains bound for Toronto and Ottawa stop at the unstaffed Gananoque station to the north of downtown. Gananoque is also served by the Gananoque Airport for general aviation.

Historically, the Gananoque River's watershed had been an important water transportation corridor, extending north to the Rideau River watershed and playing a key role in the town's early history and economic importance. In 1830, water was diverted near Newboro to the Cataraqui River as part of the Rideau Canal, sending this traffic instead to Kingston.

A four-mile short line railroad once linked the main CN Rail tracks to the heart of the village; the Thousand Islands Railway terminated near the town hall.

Gananoque Police Service  
Gananoque Police Service is a small law enforcement agency in the Eastern Ontario community of Gananoque.
  
The current Chief of Police is Scott Gee. Unlike other Towns and Villages of Ontario which have disbanded their municipal police forces in favour of contracting with the Ontario Provincial Police, the Gananoque Police Service continues to grow.

Notable persons
 Harry Brown—Gananoque-born recipient of the Victoria Cross for actions during the Battle of Hill 70 during the First World War
 Frank Belknap Long—Famed horror and science fiction writer. Long spent his summer family vacations in the vicinity with his parents, between the ages of six months and 17 years (1901–1918).
 Alyn McCauley—Gananoque-raised former NHL hockey player who currently serves as a pro scout for the Philadelphia Flyers.

References

External links

Municipalities in Leeds and Grenville United Counties
Ontario populated places on the Saint Lawrence River
Single-tier municipalities in Ontario
Towns in Ontario